Ypsolopha lutisplendida is a moth of the family Ypsolophidae. It is known from north-western China.

The length of the forewings is 9.6–10.7 mm.

The larvae feed on the pine tree Pinus tabulaeformis.

Etymology
The specific name lutisplendida is derived from the Latin luteus (meaning yellow) and splendidus (meaning shining), in concordance with the yellowish glittering of the forewings.

References

Ypsolophidae
Moths of Asia